1991 ballet premieres, List of
Lists of ballet premieres by year
Lists of 1990s ballet premieres
Ball